Faramarz Khodnegah (born 1965) is an Iranian former Strongman and Powerlifter. He currently is the official referee of Iran's Strongest Man since its first period.

Khodnegah was a weightlifter, but he had to leave this due to an injury.

Some strongmen like Mehrab Fatemi, the former champion of Iran's Strongest Man, and his older brother Mehdi Fatemi, claims that Khodnegah is not an athlete. Although they, together with Ali Esmaeili and Mojtaba Maleki, believe that he hasn't do a fair and neutral refereeing in recent Iran's Strongest Man competitions to make Rouhollah Dadashi win., Khodnegah denied it himself.

See also
Iran's Strongest Man

References

1966 births
Living people
Iranian strength athletes
Iranian powerlifters